Adon (אדון) is the Northwest Semitic for lord, mostly used of deities.

Adon may also refer to:

Places
 Adon, Loiret, France

People
 Adon P. Brown (1873–1942), American lawyer and politician
 Adon Gomis (born 1992), French footballer
 Ado of Vienne, (died 874) archbishop, saint and author of a martyrology
 Adon, a Philistine king during the 7th century BCE
 Joan Adon (born 1998), Dominican baseball player

Other uses
 ADON, assistant director of nursing
 Adon (Street Fighter), a character in the Street Fighter franchise
 El Adon, a Jewish liturgical poem
 In the Tanakh Adon may be used for men and angels as well as to El
 Greek Adonis, an adoption of Tammuz

See also
 Adonai (my lord), in Jewish tradition is used as a euphemism to refer to God
Add-on